C-type lectin domain family 11 member A is a protein that in humans is encoded by the CLEC11A gene.

Function 

This gene encodes a member of the C-type lectin superfamily. The encoded protein is a secreted sulfated glycoprotein and functions as a growth factor for primitive hematopoietic progenitor cells. An alternative splice variant has been described but its biological nature has not been determined.

References

Further reading

External links